The Brukkaros pygmy rock mouse (Petromyscus monticularis) is a species of rodent in the family Nesomyidae.
It is found in Namibia and South Africa.
Its natural habitat is subtropical or tropical dry shrubland.

References
 Coetzee, N. & Schlitter, D. 2004.  Petromyscus monticularis.   2006 IUCN Red List of Threatened Species.   Downloaded on 19 July 2007.

Petromyscus
Mammals described in 1925
Taxa named by Oldfield Thomas
Taxa named by Martin Hinton
Taxonomy articles created by Polbot
Fauna of Namibia
Fauna of South Africa